Gottlieb Weber (26 July 1910 – 4 November 1996) was a Swiss cyclist. He competed in the individual and team road race events at the 1936 Summer Olympics.

References

External links
 

1910 births
1996 deaths
Swiss male cyclists
Olympic cyclists of Switzerland
Cyclists at the 1936 Summer Olympics
Cyclists from Zürich